The National Party of Suriname (NPS) is a social democratic political party in Suriname, founded in 1946, and since June 2012 led by Gregory Rusland. For a long time it was the largest ruling party in the country, and it has been in government for a total of over 40 years. Of the 16 general elections held in Suriname, the party or a coalition it was a leading part of finished in first place 11 times. The party tends to be more popular among Afro-Surinamese and multiracial people.

At the 2005 legislative elections, the party was part of the New Front for Democracy and Development that won 41.2% of the popular vote and 23 out of 51 seats in the National Assembly.

In 1993, Ronald Venetiaan became party leader. Since that time, the NPS witnessed a decline in the elections that followed. In June 2012, Venetiaan stepped down from party leadership. Party elections were held for his successor with Gregory Rusland winning seven out of eleven districts, and Ivan Fernald winning four. Under Rusland's leadership, the party has adopted some elements of the Third Way into its ideology and moved slightly closer to the political centre.

In the 2020 elections, the NPS won 3 of the 51 seats.

Electoral results

Representation

Members of the Santokhi Cabinet (2020)

Members of the Third Venetiaan Cabinet (2005-2010)

Members of the Second Venetiaan Cabinet (2000-2005)

Members of the First Venetiaan Cabinet (1991-1996)

Members of the Shankar Cabinet (1988-1990)

Members of the Radhakishun Cabinet (1986-1987) and the First Wijdenbosch Cabinet (1987-1988)

Members of the Second Arron cabinet (1977-1980)

Members of the First Arron cabinet (1973-1977)

References

Ethnic political parties
Political parties in Suriname
Social democratic parties in South America
Afro-Surinamese